Alpha Nyan (born 19 June 1978) is a retired Norwegian football midfielder.

He grew up in the club Strømsgodset IF and was fielded as a substitute in the 1996 cup quarter-final. In 1997 he made his Eliteserien debut. He was seen as surplus, but after a period in neighbouring minnows SK Drafn he rejoined Strømsgodset in 2000, playing most games in the 2000 1. divisjon. However he only got 2 games in 2001 Tippeligaen and joined Grindvoll IL in 2002. After a miserable start in the 2002 2. divisjon he went on to Larvik Fotball in mid-season. He then played two seasons for IK Birkebeineren.

In 2005, he joined Strømsgodset for a third stint. He only got 4 games in the 2005 1. divisjon, and joined another second-tier club Manglerud Star.

In 2007 he went to fifth-tier Drammens BK where he also was employed as youth coach. In 2009 he became player-coach, this time on the senior level, in fourth-tier Svelvik IF. After that he continued for various Drammen-based clubs.

References

1978 births
Living people
Sportspeople from Drammen
Norwegian people of Gambian descent
Norwegian footballers
Strømsgodset Toppfotball players
Manglerud Star Toppfotball players
Eliteserien players
Norwegian First Division players
Association football midfielders